The Southwestern Christian Advocate (1877–1929) was a widely distributed newspaper for the African American community in the Southern United States. Like the Christian Advocate published in New York City, the publication targeted a Methodist audience. It was printed in New Orleans, Louisiana. It featured a "Lost Friends" section for people searching for loved ones lost to slavery. 

The Advocate was an official publication of the Methodist Episcopal Church. The newspaper was instrumental in organizing Booker T. Washington's tour of Louisiana in 1915.

Editors of the Advocate included Joseph C. Hartzell, Dr. I. B. Scott, and Hiram Rhodes Revels.

The Library of Congress has microfilm of the paper in its collection.

References

External links 
 
 

1877 establishments in Louisiana
1929 disestablishments in Louisiana
Publications established in 1877
Publications disestablished in 1929
Defunct African-American newspapers
Methodism in Louisiana
Newspapers published in New Orleans
Christian newspapers
Defunct newspapers published in Louisiana
Weekly newspapers published in the United States